Robert Rooth is the president and founder of The Rooth Law Firm known for representing injured victims in nursing home neglect, medical malpractice and personal injury.

Education
Robert Rooth holds a Bachelor of Arts degree from Indiana University (1981). He attended law school at Washington University School of Law and DePaul University College of Law, earning his Juris Doctor degree in 1984.

Legal career
Rooth started his legal career after training under the renowned American trial lawyer; Leonard M. Ring, from 1982 to 1987. Ever since, he has focused more on representing injured victims in medical malpractice, nursing home neglect, and personal injury cases.

Rooth was involved in high-profile cases such as the Cline Avenue Bridge Collapse Litigation, the Achille Lauro litigation, and several others.

Robert is a member of the Illinois Trial Lawyers Association, the American Association for Justice and the Illinois State Bar Association. He is past president of the Chiaravalle Montessori School Board of Trustees and the Team Evanston Soccer Club.

See also
 Medical law
 Personal injury law
 Personal injury lawyer
 Medical malpractice in the United States

References

Living people
American lawyers
Year of birth missing (living people)
Indiana University Bloomington alumni
Washington University School of Law alumni
DePaul University College of Law alumni